Sigita Burbienė (born May 17, 1954 in Vilnius) is a Lithuanian politician. She was elected to the Seimas three times.

References

1954 births
Living people
Women members of the Seimas
Politicians from Vilnius
Lithuanian municipal councillors
21st-century Lithuanian politicians
21st-century Lithuanian women politicians
Members of the Seimas